Ticket to Heaven is a 1981 Canadian drama film directed by Ralph L. Thomas and starring Nick Mancuso, Saul Rubinek, Meg Foster, Kim Cattrall, and R.H. Thomson. The plot concerns the recruiting of a man into a group portrayed to be a religious cult, and his life in the group until forcibly extracted by his family and friends. The film is based on the nonfiction book Moonwebs by Josh Freed.

Plot 
Following a relationship breakup, David Kappel (Nick Mancuso), a twentysomething school teacher, visits what turns out to be a training camp for a religious cult. At the camp, everything is done in groups, including chanting and singing.  There is also a low-calorie, low-protein diet; sleep deprivation; and constant positive reinforcement.

All of the elements of the camp begin to have an effect on David mentally. He graduates and is put to work as a volunteer laborer for the cult. In an especially powerful scene, he vomits up a hamburger and milkshake which he had just eaten in violation of cult dietary guidelines.

David sets out to work, led by cult leader Patrick (Robert Joy). David is shocked when Patrick lies to a customer, but Patrick explains that they are only "using Satan's methods to do God's work", and that it is okay because "it's only Satan's money we're taking." 
  
David's best friend Larry (Saul Rubinek) and his parents, Morley (Paul Soles) and Esther (Marcia Diamond), are concerned about him. Larry visits the cult's camp and almost falls under their influence as well. He escapes with the help of Eric (Guy Boyd), a fellow camp prospect who befriends him. The latter reveals he has been visiting various cult camps, trying to find his sister. Once free, Larry returns home.

David's parents, Larry, Eric, and some other friends forcibly kidnap David, bringing him to a private home in the area and enlisting the aid of a cult deprogrammer, Linc Strunk (R.H. Thomson), to help him regain his normal mindset. After some struggle, David slowly comes to recognize the cult's dishonesty and mistreatment. He is confused and when he asks about "true love", he is told that he only needs to look around him: at Larry, his brother Danny, Sarah, his parents, and everything they've done for him, and still are enduring for him. Crying, he embraces them all. Everyone reunites and embraces outside the deprogramming house, while several cult members watch from a distance.

Cast
 Nick Mancuso as David Kappel
 Saul Rubinek as Larry
 Meg Foster as Ingrid
 Kim Cattrall as Ruthie
 R.H. Thomson as Linc Struc
 Jennifer Dale as Lisa
 Guy Boyd as Eric
 Dixie Seatle as Sarah
 Paul Soles as Morley Kappel
 Harvey Atkin as Mr. Stone
 Robert Joy as Patrick
 Timothy Webber as Greg
 Marcia Diamond as Esther Kappel
 Michael Zelniker as Danny
 Christopher Britton as Simon
 Claire Pimparé as Sharing Group Member
 Josh Freed as Sharing Group Member
 Michael Wincott as Gerry
 Charles Gray as Musician

Reception

Critical response
The film was selected as one of the top ten films of 1981 by the National Board of Review of Motion Pictures. Roger Ebert gave the film three and a half out of four stars, but added that the ending was less interesting and powerful than the earlier cult indoctrination scenes. Janet Maslin of The New York Times called it "an absorbing, frightening, entirely believable movie, which is particularly amazing in view of its subject matter."

On Rotten Tomatoes, it has an approval rating of 78%, based on reviews from 9 critics.

Accolades
Ticket to Heaven was nominated for fourteen 1982 Genie Awards, and won four :

See also 

 3rd Genie Awards
 Cults and new religious movements in literature and popular culture

References

External links
 Reel.com
 
 
 

1981 films
Best Picture Genie and Canadian Screen Award winners
Canadian drama films
English-language Canadian films
Fictional cults
Films about cults
Films based on works by Canadian writers
Films scored by Maribeth Solomon
Films scored by Micky Erbe
Films directed by Ralph L. Thomas
Films set in San Francisco
Films shot in San Francisco
1980s English-language films
1980s Canadian films